Lomagundi is a former district of Zimbabwe (Southern Rhodiesia).

Lomagundi (cognate Nemakonde) may also refer to:

 Lomagundi College, a boarding school in the outskirts of Chinhoyi, Mashonaland West, Zimbabwe 
 Lomagundi–Jatuli isotope excursion, a global carbon isotope excursion during the Boring Billion

See also
 Nemakonde High School